The Chignecto-Central Regional Centre for Education is a Canadian public school district in Nova Scotia.

History
CCRCE (originally CCRSB) was founded in 1996 under an Order in Council passed by the Executive Council of Nova Scotia pursuant to the "Designation of School Regions and Establishment of School Boards Regulations" made under Section 7 of the Education Act S.N.S. 1995-96, c. 1. This Order in Council created CCRCE (originally CCRSB) and dissolved the following entities:

 Cumberland District School Board
 Colchester-East Hants District School Board
 Pictou District School Board

Each of these were formed in the 1980s from municipal school boards.  For example, the Colchester-East Hants District School Board was created from the Truro School Board, the Stewiacke School Board, the Colchester County School Board, and the East Hants District School Board.

2018 Dissolution
On January 23, 2018 education consultant Avis Glaze presented a report on the province's school system to government that included the recommendation that the seven elected regional school boards become regional education offices overseen by appointed provincial advisory council. On January 24, 2018, the provincial government announced it accepted the recommendation and the Halifax Regional School Board and six other school boards would be dissolved though no date for dissolution was then announced. The elected school board was dissolved on March 31, 2018.

Operational organization
CCRCE is operationally organized along county lines into regions that are termed "families of schools":

 Celtic Region Family of Schools (Pictou County)
 Nova Region Family of Schools (southern Colchester County and Municipality of the District of East Hants)
 Cobequid Region Family of Schools (central / northern Colchester County)
 Chignecto Region Family of Schools (Cumberland County)

List of schools

Celtic Region
Family of Schools Supervisor (FOSS) - Blair MacDonald
 A.G. Baillie Memorial School
 Dr. W.A. MacLeod Consolidated School
 F.H. MacDonald Elementary School
 G.R. Saunders Elementary School
McCulloch Education Centre
 New Glasgow Academy
 North Nova Education Centre
 Northumberland Regional High School
 Pictou Academy
 Salt Springs Elementary School
 Scotsburn Elementary School
 Thorburn Consolidated School
Trenton Elementary School
 Trenton Middle School
 Walter Duggan Consolidated School
 West Pictou Consolidated School

Chignecto Region
Family of Schools Supervisor (FOSS) - Vernon Taylor
 Advocate District School
 Amherst Regional High School
 Cumberland North Academy
 Cyrus Eaton Elementary School
 E.B. Chandler Junior High School
 Junction Road Elementary School
 Northport Consolidated Elementary School
 Oxford Regional Education Centre
 Parrsboro Regional Elementary School
 Parrsboro Regional High School
 Pugwash District High School
 River Hebert District School
Spring Street Academy
 Springhill Jr./Sr. High School
 Spring Street Academy School
 Wallace Consolidated School
 West End Memorial School
 West Highlands Elementary School

Cobequid Region
Family of Schools Supervisor (FOSS) - Marilyn Bruce
 Bible Hill Consolidated School
 Bible Hill Junior High School
 Central Colchester Junior High School
 Chiganois Elementary School
 Cobequid Consolidated Elementary School
 Cobequid Educational Centre
 Debert Elementary School
 Great Village Elementary School
 Harmony Heights Elementary School
 North Colchester High School
 North River Elementary School
 Redcliff Middle School
 Tatamagouche Regional Academy
 Truro Middle School
 Truro Elementary School
 Valley Elementary School
 West Colchester Consolidated School

Nova Region
Family of Schools Supervisor (FOSS) - Sharlene Whelan
 Brookfield Elementary School
 Cobequid District Elementary School
 Elmsdale District Elementary School
 Enfield District Elementary School
 Hants East Rural High School
 Hants North Rural High School
 Hilden Elementary School
 Kennetcook District Elementary School
 Maple Ridge Elementary School
 Rawdon District Elementary School
 Riverside Education Centre
 Shubenacadie District Elementary School
 South Colchester Academy
 Uniacke District School
 Upper Stewiacke Elementary School
 Winding River Consolidated Elementary School

References

External links 
Chignecto-Central Regional Centre for Education website

School districts in Nova Scotia
Education in Cumberland County, Nova Scotia
Education in Colchester County
Education in Hants County, Nova Scotia
Education in Pictou County
Truro, Nova Scotia